Hunterspoint Avenue station may refer to:
 Hunterspoint Avenue station (LIRR)
 Hunters Point Avenue station